EFID may refer to:
Protestant Women in Germany or Evangelische Frauen in Deutschland, German Christian group
Epilepsy-intellectual disability in females or Epilepsy limited to females with intellectual disability